The Northumberland Coast is a designated Area of Outstanding Natural Beauty (AONB) covering  of coastline from Berwick-Upon-Tweed to the River Coquet estuary in the Northeast of England. Features include: Alnmouth, Bamburgh, Beadnell, Budle Bay, Cocklawburn Beach, Craster, Dunstanburgh Castle, the Farne Islands, Lindisfarne and Seahouses. It lies within the natural region of the North Northumberland Coastal Plain.

Geography
The coastal area is situated to the east of the A1 road. It is sparsely populated and includes sandy beaches, sand dunes, rugged cliffs and isolated islands. It includes two National Nature Reserves. Fortresses and peel towers along the coast are evidence of past conflicts between the English and Scots in this border area. Coal fields are nearby and sea coal is washed up on the beaches.

See also
 Northumberland
 Northeast England

External links
 Northumberland Coast - Area of Outstanding Natural Beauty (AONB)
 The Northumberland Coast Path - Walking the Northumberland Coast 
 Enjoy Northumberland
 A Visitors Guide to Towns and Villages on the Northumberland Coast

Areas of Outstanding Natural Beauty in England
Landforms of Northumberland
Protected areas established in 1958
Protected areas of Northumberland
Coasts of England
Natural regions of England